Sosnovka is a rural locality (a selo) and the administrative center of Sosnovskoye Rural Settlement, Beryozovsky District, Perm Krai, Russia. The population was 215 as of 2010.

References 

Rural localities in Beryozovsky District, Perm Krai